Jonathan Mock Beck (aka Jon Beck; 11 November 1935 – 11 March 2006, Somerville, Massachusetts) was an American mathematician, who worked on category theory and algebraic topology.

Career
Beck received his PhD in 1967 under Samuel Eilenberg at Columbia University. Beck was a faculty member of the mathematics department of Cornell University and of the University of Puerto Rico. He is known for the eponymous Beck's tripleableness (monadicity) theorem and the Beck–Chevalley condition.

Publications

References

20th-century American mathematicians
21st-century American mathematicians
1935 births
2006 deaths
People from Somerville, Massachusetts
Mathematicians from Massachusetts
Columbia University alumni
Cornell University faculty
Topologists